Samwel is an alternate form of Samuel used in East Africa. Samwel may refer to:

Samwel Mushai Kimani (born 1989), Kenyan visually impaired middle-distance runner
Samwel Mohochi (born 1972), Kenyan human rights activist and attorney
Samwel Mwera (born 1985), Tanzanian middle distance runner 
Samwel Shauri (born 1985), Tanzanian long-distance runner

See also
Samwell